North Dundas District High School (NDDHS) is a high school located in Chesterville, Ontario, Canada. It features grades 7 through 12 and has approximately 500 students.

Notable alumni

 Warren Meredith, The Ginger Fox Band lead singer 
 Francine Villeneuve, retired thoroughbred jockey and racing pioneer

See also
List of high schools in Ontario

High schools in Ontario
Educational institutions established in 1963
1963 establishments in Ontario